Estêvão de Brito (c. 15701641) was a Portuguese composer of polyphony.

Life
Estêvão de Brito was born in Serpa, Portugal. He studied music at the Cathedral of Évora with Filipe de Magalhães. In January 1597 he was already mestre de capela of the Cathedral of Badajoz (Spain), where he stayed until 1613. In that year, he went to the cathedral of Málaga and succeeded Francisco Vásquez bearing the same office as Cristóbal de Morales, precisely 50 years before. He stayed in Málaga until his death in 1641.

Work
It is known that de Brito composed numerous villancicos and cançonetas, most of them for the Christian feasts of Christmas and Corpus Christi. Unfortunately, these works were lost due to the devastation of the 1755 Lisbon earthquake. However, the most relevant in de Brito's work are the liturgic pieces: 4-, 5-, 6-, and 8-voice masses, motets, psalms, and hymns.

Recordings
1993, Portuguese Renaissance Music, Voces Angelicae, Teldec Classics International 4509-93690-2
includes 5 works by de Brito.
 1991, Lamentations, Oxford Camerata, Jeremy Summerly, Naxos - Early Music
 Lamentations of Jeremiah by White, Tallis, Lassus and Estêvão de Brito

References
Enciclopédia Verbo Luso-Brasileira de Cultura, vol. 5, "Brito (Estêvão de)", ed. Verbo, Lisboa/São Paulo, 1998

External links

1570s births
1641 deaths
People from Serpa
Renaissance composers
Portuguese Baroque composers
16th-century Portuguese people
17th-century Portuguese people
17th-century classical composers
Portuguese male classical composers
17th-century male musicians